"Ritual" is a song by electronic dance music producer and DJ Marshmello, featuring American singer Wrabel. It was released on November 1, 2016, and marked his first release on American record label Owsla. The song appeared on the charts in the US and Canada, peaking at number 8 in the US Dance/Electronic Digital Song Sales chart. The song was also renowned for its music video, due to its copyright dispute by Canadian electronic music producer deadmau5.

Music video

On November 1, 2016, Marshmello released the original music video for "Ritual". The video was directed by Andrew Donoho and released on Owsla's YouTube channel, of which the upload has amassed over 50 million views. The video was also uploaded onto Marshmello's own YouTube channel. EDM Artists Skrillex, Slushii and Valentino Khan were featured on the video.

deadmau5 dispute
The music video for "Ritual" originally briefly featured an interpretation of Canadian electronic music producer and DJ deadmau5's "mau5head" logo (with a third ear as a Mohawk) being worn by a fan. This was disputed by deadmau5, who claimed "I'd rather be associated with a pile of dog shit". On November 3, 2016, the music video was reuploaded with the disputed scene removed. However, the original upload remains on record label Owsla's YouTube channel, but is currently unlisted.

Marshmello had previously referenced deadmau5, in the music video for "Alone", which features Marshmello's pet mouse, Joel (deadmau5's real name).

Track listing

Charts

Weekly charts

Year-end charts

References

2016 singles
2016 songs
Marshmello songs
Owsla singles
Songs written by Marshmello
Songs written by Wrabel
Wrabel songs
Songs written by Morgan Taylor Reid